"I Gotta Feeling" is a song recorded by American group the Black Eyed Peas for their fifth studio album The E.N.D. (2009). It was written by the group members with the song's producers David Guetta and Frédéric Riesterer. The song was released as the second single from The E.N.D. on June 15, 2009, by Interscope Records.

"I Gotta Feeling" debuted at number two on the US Billboard Hot 100, behind the group's previous single "Boom Boom Pow", making the group one of 11 artists who have occupied the top two positions of the Billboard Hot 100 at the same time. It went on to spend 14 consecutive weeks atop the Billboard Hot 100, making it the longest-running number-one single of 2009. The song was ranked at number five on the Billboard Hot 100 decade-end chart and at number eight on the all-time chart. Internationally, it peaked atop the charts in over 20 countries, and was the third most successful song of the decade in Australia.

Critically acclaimed, "I Gotta Feeling" was nominated for Record of the Year at the 52nd Annual Grammy Awards (2010) and won the Grammy Award for Best Pop Performance by a Duo or Group with Vocals. It was also nominated for Song of the Year at the 2010 World Music Awards. In March 2011, it became the first song in digital history to sell over seven million digital copies in the United States. , it has sold over nine million downloads in the country, and held the record as the most downloaded song on the iTunes Store of all time. This also makes it the highest-selling digital non-charity single in the US ever.

Background
"I Gotta Feeling" was written and composed by all the members of the Black Eyed Peas (credited as William Adams, Allan Pineda, Jaime Gomez, and Stacy Ferguson) together with French producers David Guetta, Frédéric Riesterer (a.k.a.  ), both of whom produced the song. Adams provided additional synthesizer work to the song. The song was recorded at Square Prod in Paris, France and Metropolis Studios in London, England, United Kingdom. "I Gotta Feeling" is the second single released from The E.N.D (2009). Interscope Records serviced the song to contemporary hit and rhythmic crossover radios on June 23, 2009, in the United States. In an interview with Annie Reuter of Marie Claire, will.i.am stated that "It's dedicated to all the party people out there in the world that want to go out and party. Mostly every song on the Black Eyed Peas record is painting a picture of our party life. It was a conscious decision to make this type of record. Times are really hard for a lot of people and you want to give them escape and you want to make them feel good about life, especially at these low points."

Composition
The song is an uptempo dance-pop song that runs a length of four minutes and 49 seconds. It follows in the inspirational dance-pop theme of The E.N.D, being built upon the heavy use of Auto-Tune and futuristic synthesizers while running through a tick-tock rhythm. It is composed in the key of G major. The song begins in a restrained fashion then moves into a throbbing dance beat that changes patterns so that at least one reviewer thought it shifted tempos, although in fact the tempo does not change at all, suggesting the use of a click track in recording. It contains electronic influences. The song samples a beat from the song "Take a Dive" by Bryan Pringle. Ann Powers of Los Angeles Times noted the song's similarities to Five Stairsteps' song "Ooh Child", writing that it emulates the song's "use of a repetitive, warm vocal line to signify a good mood coming on." According to Jimmy Iovine of the Interscope Geffen A&M label group, the melody was inspired by the U2 song "I'll Go Crazy If I Don't Go Crazy Tonight": "I sent will.i.am over to the studio to do some remixes on I'll Go Crazy. He works on them for two weeks, comes back and writes I Gotta Feeling. The chords are U2 chords, 100 per cent. Will even told them."

Critical reception
"I Gotta Feeling" received generally positive reviews from music critics. David Balls, a writer for Digital Spy, gave the song a four-star rating, writing that the song is "every bit as quirky as its predecessor ("Boom Boom Pow")". However, he compared it to Girls Aloud's "Biology", writing that they sound like a collection of musical ideas "that only makes sense after a few listens." Another writer for Digital Spy, Nick Levine, praised "I Gotta Feeling" and "Rock That Body" as ace collaborations with French disc jockey David Guetta. Music critics like John Bush of All Music Guide and Andy Gill of The Independent labeled it as one of the album's best tracks. Ann Powers wrote a positive review about "I Gotta Feeling", noting that "the Peas do let in some human sweetness and light" on the song and that it uses "a repetitive, warm vocal line to signify a good mood coming on."

Ben Westhoff of Las Vegas Weekly dismissed the song as a blend of house, electro and dancehall beats that do not work compared to songs on The E.N.D like "Imma Be" and "One Tribe". Mike Schiller, a writer for PopMatters, found the song to be irresistible, writing that it "is one of those dance tunes that's impossible to hate thanks to something like good natured naïveté". In his review of the album for Stuff.co.nz, Chris Schultz dismissed the lyrics, writing that they were the worst since Flo Rida's "Right Round".

The Observer-Dispatch writer David T. Farr praised the song as "the summer track of 2009", writing that "It's one of those songs you grasp onto right away and crank up as the beat goes on, even the first time you hear it (guilty as charged)." Will Hines of Consequence of Sound shared similar feelings about "I Gotta Feeling", defining it as "chart baiting". Guy Blackman, a writer for The Age, labeled "I Gotta Feeling" and "Boom Boom Pow" as further dumbed-down dance-pop songs. Bill Lamb of About.com gave the song a four-star rating, praising it for the difference of style from previous releases by the Black Eyed Peas and as a great summer song with a feel good mood., but he criticized the lack of lyrical depth and constant use of Auto-Tune. Billboards Chris Williams praised the song as their most mainstream release, writing that "they trade off on a simple, yet effective melody and message".

Chart performance
"I Gotta Feeling" followed in the international success of The E.N.Ds lead single "Boom Boom Pow". In the United States, the song debuted on the Billboard Hot 100 at number two, behind "Boom Boom Pow", prompted by sales of 249,000 downloads. The song held at number two for another week before rising to the top position on the chart. On July 30, 2009, it was reported that the song, along with "Boom Boom Pow" helped earn the Black Eyed Peas the longest run at number one on the Billboard Hot 100 by a duo or group (17 weeks). The song stayed at number one on the chart for a total of fourteen weeks before being unseated by Jay Sean's "Down". The song, together with "Boom Boom Pow", earned the group a total of 26 consecutive weeks atop the Hot 100 chart while also earning them their longest running single on the chart, with a total of 56 weeks logged.

"I Gotta Feeling" also peaked at number one on several other Billboard charts, including Hot Digital Songs, Mainstream Top 40, and Radio Songs. It was the group's second single to sell over 6 million downloads in the United States, and was certified 7× Platinum on August 25, 2010, by the Recording Industry Association of America (RIAA) signifying sales of over 7 million units. It was the first song to reach sales of over 6 million (November 25, 2010), 7 million (March 20, 2011), 8 million (June 24, 2012), and 9 million (June 7, 2019). It also earned the accolade of being the best digital seller in history.

In Canada, the song debuted on the Canadian Hot 100 at number two behind "Boom Boom Pow", similar to its beginning run in the United States, on the week ending June 27, 2009. The next week, it rose to number one following a surge in airplay, where it maintained that position for 16 consecutive weeks, setting the record for longest run at number one since the chart's inception in 2007. The song was present on the chart for a total of 76 weeks, setting the record for longest stay on the chart. The song was certified Diamond by Music Canada for sales of over 800,000 digital downloads.

"I Gotta Feeling" fared similarly in international markets. The song had a slower rise in the United Kingdom, where it debuted at number 70 on the week ending June 20, 2009. It quickly picked up momentum, moving into the top five in its fifth week on the chart. On the week ending August 8, 2009, the song peaked at number one, becoming the group's third number one and staying there for two non-consecutive weeks. "I Gotta Feeling" held within the top ten for 16 consecutive weeks and lasted on the chart for a total of 76 weeks. The song was certified 4× Platinum by the British Phonographic Industry on June 3, 2022, for sales and streams of 2.4 million units. "I Gotta Feeling" became the first song to sell over one million units based solely on the strength of digital downloads, and has sold over 1.44 million copies in the United Kingdom as of May 2014. In Ireland, the song peaked at number one and held that position for 12 non-consecutive weeks, falling to number two on the week of August 27, 2009, after six weeks in the top position. It rose to number one the following week and held that position for another six weeks. In Sweden, the song debuted on the chart at number 36 on the week ending July 19, 2009. It quickly entered the top ten and peaked at number one in its seventh week on the chart. "I Gotta Feeling" maintained its position there for eight consecutive weeks and stayed present on the charts for a total of 87 weeks. The single was certified double platinum for sales of 40,000 units. In Germany, the song debuted on the chart at number seven and rose to number three two weeks later.

"I Gotta Feeling" peaked at number one in countries including Australia, Austria, Belgium, Denmark, Italy, The Netherlands, and New Zealand. The song reached top five peak positions in Finland, France, Norway, and Spain. It has sold over seven million units worldwide in 2009 and an additional six million in 2010, as reported by the IFPI.

Live performance
On September 8, 2009, the song was performed (with slight modification) by the Black Eyed Peas for the taping of the Kick-off Party for the 24th season of The Oprah Winfrey Show, with 21,000 fans performing a dance on the "Magnificent Mile" portion of Michigan Avenue in Chicago, Illinois. They also performed the song at the 52nd Grammy Awards nomination announcement ceremony with David Guetta (a remix edit by David Guetta appears on his album, One Love). The Black Eyed Peas also performed the song during a concert at Mont Kiara, Kuala Lumpur, Malaysia in 2009. Being the headliners of the Super Bowl XLV halftime show, the Black Eyed Peas sang "I Gotta Feeling" in front of more than 100,000 fans at Cowboys Stadium. On April 29, 2011, they performed the song along with others at the "i.am.FIRST" event at the FIRST Robotics Competition World Championships. For Queen Elizabeth II's Diamond Jubilee Concert, will.i.am and Jessie J sang a duet of "I Gotta Feeling". At the last part of the 2019 Southeast Asian Games closing ceremony at the New Clark City Athletics Stadium in the Philippines, this song was performed again, except that Fergie's part was sung by J Rey Soul (stage name of Jessica Reynoso), whom apl.de.ap introduced to the audience.

Music video

The official final version was released on June 2 on Dipdive and on June 15 on iTunes. There is both a censored version and an explicit version of the music video and a live performance of the explicit video. The video starts with scenes in Hollywood Blvd. and then showing will.i.am combing his hair and Fergie putting on make-up while wearing lingerie. It also shows Taboo checking his messages on Dipdive and apl.de.ap checking his text messages. Then it cuts to the party as the first verse starts. The video ends with a large sign with human-sized letters that reads "The E.N.D" The video is directed by Mikey Mee of Little Minx and features guest appearances by David Guetta, Kid Cudi, members of the indie rock band Gossip, the designer duo Dean and Dan Caten of Dsquared2 and RuPaul's Drag Race alumni Ongina.

Track listing
 Digital download (worldwide version) "I Gotta Feeling" – 4:49

 UK CD Single "I Gotta Feeling" (Radio Edit) – 4:06
 "Boom Boom Pow" (David Guetta's Electro Hop Remix) – 4:05

 German CD Single "I Gotta Feeling" (Radio Edit) – 4:06
 "Boom Boom Guetta" (David Guetta's Electro Hop Remix) – 4:05
 "I Gotta Feeling" (Instrumental Version) – 4:49
 "I Gotta Feeling" (Official Video) – 4:52
 Digital Download E.P.'''
 "I Gotta Feeling" (David Guetta's FMIF Remix) – 6:12
 "I Gotta Feeling" (Printz Board vs. Zuper Blahq Remix) – 5:04
 "I Gotta Feeling" (Laidback Luke Remix) – 6:28
 "I Gotta Feeling" (Zuper Blahq Remix) – 5:48
 "I Gotta Feeling" (Taboo's Broken Spanglish Remix) – 4:51

Credits and personnel
Credits adapted from the liner notes of The E.N.D, Interscope Records, in association with will.i.am Music Group.

Recording and mixing
 Recorded at Square Prod in Paris, France and Metropolis Studios in London, England, United Kingdom.
 Mixed by Dylan "3-D" Dresdow at Paper V.U. Studios and Record Plant in Los Angeles, CA, USA.

Personnel
 Songwriting – will.i.am, apl.de.ap, Taboo, Fergie, David Guetta, Frederick Riesterer
 Vocals - will.i.am, apl.de.ap, Taboo, Fergie
 Production – David Guetta, Frederick Riesterer
 Synths – will.i.am

Charts

 Weekly charts 

Monthly charts

Year-end charts

Decade-end charts

 All-time charts 

Certifications

Release history

Other cover versions and use in popular media
 In September 2009, Canadian freshmen students from Université du Québec à Montréal performed the song as a lip dub as part of orientation week. After a month, their  had over one million views on YouTube and was talked about on media outlets around the world, including American news channel CNN. This in turn was later referenced by the season 7 premiere of the television series The Office'', in which the show's cast perform a similar lip dub set to the Human Beinz's cover of "Nobody but Me".
 Justine Ezarik produced a parody video of the song that focused on going to events mainly to update one's social media profile picture; it gained 16 million views on YouTube.
 The song was played prior to the entrance of the athletes at the Men's Ice Hockey Final at the 2010 Winter Olympics in Vancouver and 2014 Winter Olympics in Sochi.

See also

References

External links
 Will.i.am's blog on Dipdive
 Music video on Dipdive
 Analysis of the songwriting techniques in "I Got a Feeling"
 

2009 singles
Billboard Hot 100 number-one singles
Number-one singles in Australia
Number-one singles in Austria
Canadian Hot 100 number-one singles
Number-one singles in Denmark
European Hot 100 Singles number-one singles
Irish Singles Chart number-one singles
Dutch Top 40 number-one singles
Number-one singles in Israel
Number-one singles in Italy
Number-one singles in New Zealand
Number-one singles in Romania
Number-one singles in Scotland
Number-one singles in Sweden
UK Singles Chart number-one singles
Ultratop 50 Singles (Flanders) number-one singles
Ultratop 50 Singles (Wallonia) number-one singles
Songs written by will.i.am
Songs written by Fergie (singer)
Songs written by David Guetta
Black Eyed Peas songs
Interscope Records singles
Songs written by Frédéric Riesterer
2009 songs
Songs written by apl.de.ap
Songs written by Taboo (rapper)
Song recordings produced by David Guetta